Grand Duke Sergei may refer to:

 Grand Duke Sergei Alexandrovich of Russia (1857-1905)
 Grand Duke Sergei Mikhailovich of Russia (1869-1918)